The Mua mine is a large iron mine located in central Portugal in the Bragança District. Mua represents one of the largest iron ore reserves in Portugal and in the world having estimated reserves of 2.56 billion tonnes of ore grading 37% iron metal. The mine is exploited by Aethel Mining headed by Ricardo Santos Silva.

References 

Iron mines in Portugal
Buildings and structures in Bragança District